Amazophrynella bokermanni is a species of toad in the family Bufonidae. It is endemic to Brazil and only known from the region of its type locality, the Amazonas state. Its natural habitats are old-growth forests where it occurs in leaf-litter. The eggs are laid on aerial roots over temporary pools where the tadpoles then develop.

The species is threatened by habitat loss. It occurs in the Rio Trombetas Biological Reserve.

References

bokermanni
Endemic fauna of Brazil
Amphibians of Brazil
Taxa named by Eugênio Izecksohn
Amphibians described in 1994
Taxonomy articles created by Polbot